The Saint-Maurice River (Atikamekw: Tapiskwan sipi) flows north to south in central Quebec from Gouin Reservoir to empty into the Saint Lawrence River at Trois-Rivières, in the province of Quebec, in Canada. Saint-Maurice River is one of the most important tributaries of the St. Lawrence River.

The main tributaries of the Saint-Maurice River are:
 Matawin River, whose mouth is at Matawin (Hamlet);
 Vermillon River (La Tuque) which empties about 23 km, 14 miles (by water) upstream (north) of the Beaumont generating station in La Tuque;
 Manouane River (La Tuque) which empties about 115 km, 70 miles (by water) upstream (north) of La Tuque;
 La Trenche River (La Tuque) which empties near the La Trenche Generating Station;
 Croche River (La Tuque) which empties at north of La Tuque.

Between Weymontachie and Trois-Rivières, the St-Maurice River has 27 tributaries identified as significant enough for downhill wood: Weymontachingue, Manouane, Little Rock, Little Flamand, Windigo, Flamand, Coucoucache, Grande Pierriche (Great Pierriche), Petite Pierriche (Little Pierriche), "La Trenche", Vermillion, Croche, Rivière-au-Lait, Bostonnais, Little Bostonnais, Small Stream, Mountain, Caribou, Rivière-aux-Rats, Wessonneau, Little Batiscan River, l'Oiseau (Bird), Bête Puante (Beast Puante), Mattawin, Mekinac, River "au Lac des Pêches" and Shawinigan River.

During the 18th century, early fur traders travelled along the river. During the second half of the 19th century, logging became an important industry in the surrounding Mauricie region. For much of the 20th century, the river was used to transport logs to mills down river and it was, and still is, a major source of hydroelectric power.

First communication channel in this region, the river was used by local Native Americans long before the arrival of Europeans on the spot. Early explorations by religious conversion in pain and trappers in search of furs for the trade, it was one of the primary routes of rivers in Quebec.

Several municipalities have been established on its banks, thereby taking advantage of its hydroelectric power where the falls were high enough to install a dam integration an electrical generating station. Among other cities, La Tuque, Shawinigan and Trois-Rivières are the best known, and are themselves located along the Route 155 which connects the St. Lawrence River to Lake St. John.

Origin of name

The original name of the river was "Métabéroutin", the name given by Algonquin, which means "discharge of the wind" and in turn, the Attikameks of Haute-Mauricie still call "Sipi Tapiskwan", the "river of the threaded needle". The Abenaki the call the river "Madôbaladenitekw" or the "river that ends". Jacques Cartier named it "River Fouez" in honor of the House of Foix in 1535. However, this name was abandoned in the early 17th century to the name of "Three Rivers". Its current name was given in the early 18th century in reference to the "fief of Saint-Maurice", the common name of lordship on the west bank granted about 1668 to Maurice Poulin in La Fontaine, government prosecutor of Three Rivers. He was the owner of some property along the river in the 17th century. The name "St. Maurice" is attested for the first time in a judgment dated 1723 and definitely supplanted the "Three Rivers" between 1730 and 1740.

The river gave its name to the administrative region of Mauricie.

Communities 
Communities on the river include, from the mouth of the river:

Bridges and other cross structures 
Order from downstream (Trois-Rivières) toward upstream:

Territory of Shawinigan

Territory of La Tuque

Hydroelectric power stations and other dams 
Order from downstream (Trois-Rivières) to upstream:

All plants on the St. Maurice are the property of Hydro-Québec.

Timber transportation 
In 1996, the Saint-Maurice River was the last river in Quebec to stop the transportation of timber by flotation. For nearly 150 years, companies in forestry have used the current of the river and its tributaries for timber transportation. Before being stacked on the ice in Upper-Mauricie, logs were identified in order to be recovered downstream where baunes were implemented, including Grandes-Piles, in Grand-Mère, Shawinigan or Trois-Rivières.

Each spring, an army of loggers cleaned the river banks for delivering timbers which were hung on the shores, bays, rocks or in riparian wood. The loggers sorted the timbers for relaunching them into the water for redirecting them to Pulp paper plant downstream.

Wildlife fish 

In the last 174 kilometers (108 miles), between Trois-Rivières and La Tuque, the experts found 42 fish species frequenting the river. The density of fish biomass is generally low, which is characteristic of rivers in Canadian Shield.

See also
List of Quebec rivers
1663 Charlevoix earthquake
Île Anselme-Fay

References

External links

Tourisme Mauricie Regional tourist office

 
Rivers of Mauricie
Tributaries of the Saint Lawrence River
Hydrological system of Saint-Maurice